Hurley High School is a public high school located in Hurley, Virginia in Buchanan County, Virginia, United States. Opened in 1969 to replace the earlier high school, which became D.A. Justus Elementary. It is part of the Buchanan County Public Schools system.

Extracurricular activities
Hurley was awarded with the 2011 championship for Creative Writing. Clubs and organizations at the school include: Future Business Leaders of America, Student Council Association, National Beta Club, Scholastic Bowl, FCCLA, Forensics

Sports
Athletic teams compete in the Virginia High School League's A Black Diamond District in Region D. Its mascot is a Rebel soldier. The school's boys basketball team was given the Marshall Johnson Sportsmanship Award for Basketball for the 2010–2011 season.

Relocation
In January 2020, the Huntington District of the U.S. Army Corps of Engineers (USACE) announced the allocation of $235.6 million to Buchanan County for flood relief protection. The funding was made available through the Additional Supplemental Appropriations for Disaster Relief Act, a bipartisan bill which was signed into law on June 6, 2019 to help communities construct flood and storm damage reduction projects.  Under USACE's plan, the project’s primary components included a voluntary floodproofing and floodplain evacuation program, in which the Buchanan County Career, Technology & Higher Learning Center (BCCTHLC) would get a ring wall to protect it from flooding, while Hurley High School qualified for relocation.  Although USACE had primary responsibility for selecting a new site in Hurley, the Buchanan County School Board was allowed to choose an alternative site, which it did in February 2020 by selecting Southern Gap for the high school's relocation.

References

External links
 

Schools in Buchanan County, Virginia
Public high schools in Virginia
1969 establishments in Virginia
Educational institutions established in 1969